The Vertu Ti is an Android mobile phone made by Vertu in England. It features a titanium case with a sapphire screen making it more robust than most smartphones. The phone retailed at £6700 (€7900, $10500).

It shares similar hardware and the same battery pack as Nokia's Lumia 920, and is also manufactured by Nokia, which formerly owned Vertu.

Made of grade 5 Titanium, polished ceramic and partially covered with leather, the Vertu Ti was announced and released in February 2013. The phone sports a 1.7 GHz dual-core CPU and 1 gigabyte of RAM, 64 gigabytes of built-in storage which can be increased by up to 32 gigabytes with a removable MicroSD memory card. The display is a TFT capacitive, multitouch, scratch-resistant, sapphire crystal glass touchscreen with 16,000,000 colors, 480 x 800 pixels in resolution, and 3.7 inches in physical size thereby giving out 252 pixels per inch (PPI).

The phone is equipped with an 8-megapixel camera which captures up to 3264x2448 pixel pictures, and is featured with autofocus, geo-tagging and an LED flash.  The front-facing camera has a resolution of 1.3 megapixels.

References 

Android (operating system) devices
Smartphones
Mobile phones introduced in 2013
Discontinued smartphones